Muhammad Nazeer Khan (born 1 January 1971) is a Pakistani politician who had been a member of the National Assembly of Pakistan, from June 2013 to May 2018.

Early life

He was born on 1 January 1971.

Political career

He was elected to the National Assembly of Pakistan as an independent candidate from Constituency NA-40 (Tribal Area-V) in 2013 Pakistani general election. He received 18,055 votes and defeated an independent candidate, Aurangzeb Khan. During his tenure as Member of the National Assembly, he served as the Federal Parliamentary Secretary for Federal Education and Professional Training.

References

Living people
Pashtun people
Pakistani MNAs 2013–2018
People from Khyber Pakhtunkhwa
1971 births